Jindong is a town under the administration of Xinyi, Guangdong, China. , it administers the following two residential neighborhoods and 23 villages:
Neighborhoods
Jindong
Jingkou

Villages
Jindong Village
Shangmo Village
Mala Village
Shanggui Village
Baihua Village
Siliu Village
Hedong Village
Liuming Village
Shengji Village
Liusheng Village
Guangrong Village
Nantun Village
Huanqiu Village
Xingfu Village
Michang Village
Lianggeng Village
Lshui Village
Dalang Village
Gaoche Village
Pingdi Village
Muwei Village
Muxin Village
Tianxin Village

References 

Township-level divisions of Guangdong
Xinyi, Guangdong